Patuakhali is a district in South-central Bangladesh in the Barisal Division. This district is the main entrance for the beach of Kuakata.

Geography
It is adjacent to the Bay of Bengal. The area of the district is 3220.15 km2.

Patuakhali city is surrounded on three sides by rivers. The two major rivers are Laukathi and Lohalia, which are directly connected with the Bay of Bengal. The city has an inland airport used for transport and private travel across the country.

A number of different tribal peoples live in the district.

Subdistrict

There are 8 upazilas in this district. They are:

Dumki Upazila
Patuakhali Sadar Upazila
Mirzaganj Upazila
Bauphal Upazila
Galachipa Upazila
Dashmina Upazila
Rangabali Upazila
Kalapara Upazila

Administration
 Administrator of Zila Porishod: Mr. Khalilur Rahman Mohon
 Deputy Commissioner (DC): MD. Matiul Islam Chawdhury
 Superintendent of Police (SP): Mr.Md.Shahidullah PPM

Economy
Agriculture is the profession of the most of the people. Fishing is also a prominent profession of this district. Thousands of boats go into the deep sea to fish and come back with tons of fish. Paddy, jute, and different types of vegetables are the main product of agriculture sector.
Main sources of income Agriculture 57.05%, non-agricultural labourer 5.37%, industry 1.03%, commerce 13.79%, transport and communication 2.04%, service 9.22%, construction 2.13%, religious service 0.26%, rent and remittance 0.40% and others 8.71%.

Crops
Main Crops of Patuakhali district areas as follows: 

 Paddy 
 Jute 
 Potato 
 Pea 
 Lentil
 Gram 
 sesame
 Chilli 
 mustard 
 Linseed
 Coriander seed
 Peanut
 betel leaf 
 Sugarcane 
 Watermelon 
 Vegetables

Fruits
The fruit trees indigenous to Patuakhali district areas as follows:

 Mango
 Banana
 Guava
 Jamun
 Custard-apple or আতা 
 Tamarind
 Grapefruit
 Lime
 Jackfruit
 Papaya
 Pineapple
 Bengal almond
 Lichi
 Pomegranate
 Palm or Tal
 Common fig 
 Haritaki
 Date – scarce
 Coconut – scarce

Education
The literacy rate of Patuakhali is 54.1%; male 56.2% and female 52.0%. 
Educational institutions: university 1, agricultural and veterinary college 1, college 65, technical and vocational institutes 6, secondary school 288, primary school 1152, kindergarten 36, madrasa 506.

 Universities
Patuakhali Science and Technology University

 Medical College
 Patuakhali Medical College

 Colleges
 Idris Molla Mahavidyalaya
 Patuakhali Govt College
 Patuakhali Government Womens College
 Bauphal Govt College
 Dr. Eakub Sharif Degree College 
 Kalapara Govt College
 Janata College
 Rangabali Government College

 Schools
Kalaia Secondary School
Abdul High Bidda Nakeiton
 Patuakhali Government Jubilee High School
 Patuakhali Collectorate School and College
 Auliapur Adarsho Secondary School 
 Patuakhali Government Girl's High School
 Kanakdia Sir Salimullah High School & college
 Madhya Madanpura Secondary School
 Polytechnic Institute
 Patuakhali Polytechnic Institute
 Begum Fazilatunnesa Polytechnic Institute 
 Kanakdia Sir Salimullah High School
 Ayla Secondary School

Demographics 

According to the 2011 Bangladesh census, the district had a population of 1,535,854, of which 753,441 were males and 782,413 females. Rural population was 1,333,972 (86.86%) while urban population was 201,882 (13.14%). The literacy rate is 54.1% for 7 years and above: 56.2% for males and 52.0% for females.

Religion 

The district is overwhelmingly Muslim. Similar to other districts in the Barisal division, the minority Hindu and Christian populations have seen a decline in absolute numbers in the 2001-2011 period. The district has 4765 mosques, 422 temples, and 13 churches.

Patuakhali city

The city of Patuakhali is situated beside two local rivers: Laukathi River and Lohalia River. During high tides some of the regions of Patuakhali get flooded. The Bay of Bengal is not far from the region.

At the entrance of the city there is a bridge that connects Barisal (the divisional city) with Patuakhali and Kuakata Beach.

As Patuakhali is a coastal area, it is affected almost every year by natural disasters like cyclones, floods and tornadoes. To help the disaster-affected people, many NGO's are active in the area. They play a vital role in developing the life style of poor people.

Bura Ghuranga river view from the bank of Bura Ghuranga river in beside the Gazi Bhari, East Auliapur, Ronghopaldi, Arojbegi, Dhasmina.

Port of Payra

Port of Payra is planned to become the third sea port of Bangladesh (after Chittagong and Mongla).

Notable people 
 A. K. M. Fazlul Haque, colorectal surgeon
 Abdul Hady Talukdar, academic
 Sohag Gazi, cricketer of the Bangladesh national cricket team
 KM Nurul Huda, Chief Election Commissioner of Bangladesh
 Faiz Ahmed, Senior Secretary, Member of Public Service Commission
 Nurul Haq Nur, joint-convenor of Bangladesh Sadharan Chhatra Adhikar Sangrakshan Parishad and vice-president, Dhaka University Central Students' Union

See also
Districts of Bangladesh
Barisal Division
Afalkati

Notes

References

External links
 

 
Districts of Bangladesh
Districts of Bangladesh established before 1971
Upazilas of Patuakhali District